The 2015 Match des Champions was the 10th edition of the annual super cup game in French basketball. This year the reigning LNB Pro A champions Limoges CSP faced off against French Cup champions SIG Strasbourg. The meeting was also a re-match of the 2014–15 Pro A Finals.

Strasbourg beat Limoges 59–86. Rodrigue Beaubois was named the games Most Valuable Player.

Match

References

2015
Match